Tal Herzog , is an Israeli professional poker player, from Caesarea. Herzog won second place at the main event of the World Series of Poker Winter Online Circuit.

Early life and education
Herzog was born in Israel, in 1996. He served in the 202nd Paratroopers Brigade "Viper" of the Israel Defense Forces. After finishing his military service, Herzog studied psychology. He recently became the professional manager of the soon-to-be-launched theAcademy.Poker.

Career
Herzog has been playing professional poker since 2018. In 2021, going by the moniker “Turkey1”, he won $923,165 and 2nd place at the main event World Series of Poker Winter Online Circuit.

World Series of Poker wins

References

External links 
 
 *Herzog on cardplayer 

1996 births
Living people
Israeli poker players